The Upper Midwest Emmy Awards are a division of the National Academy of Television Arts and Sciences. The Minnesota division was founded in 1973. In addition to granting the Upper Midwest Emmy Awards, this division awards scholarships, honors industry veterans at the Silver Circle Celebration, conducts National Student Television Awards of Excellence, has a free research and a nationwide job bank. The chapter also participates in judging Emmy entries at the regional and national levels.

Boundaries

The academy is divided into the following boundaries and encompasses the states of Minnesota, Iowa, North Dakota, South Dakota, parts of Nebraska and Wisconsin. These boundaries are responsible for the submission of television broadcast materials presented for awards considerations.

Board of directors

The Board of Governors is a working board which work together collaboratively to ensure the best interests of the membership.

Carol Rueppel, President
KMSP/WFTC, Eden Prairie

Jason DeRusha, Vice President
WCCO, Minneapolis

Shari Lamke, Treasurer
tpt/KTCA, St. Paul

Ken Stone, Secretary
University of Minnesota, Woodbury

Bridget Breen, Regional Vice President
KTIV, Sioux City

Charley Johnson, Regional Vice President
KVLY/KXJB, Fargo

Dave Busiek, Regional Vice President
KCCI, Des Moines

Beth Jensen, Regional Vice President
KELO, Sioux Falls

Noel Sederstrom, Regional Vice President
KTTC, Rochester

Julie Anderson
KARE, Minneapolis

Claire Auckinthaler
Minneapolis

Karen Boros
University of St. Thomas, Minneapolis

Shawn Braith
KSTP/KSTC, Minneapolis

Harold Crump
HBI, St. Paul

Dennis Grant
KMSP, Eden Prairie

Joe Johnston
KSTC, Minneapolis

Jennifer Kasel
WCCO, Minneapolis

Susan Loyd
WCCO, Minneapolis

Joseph Maar
FSN, Minneapolis

Whitney Mares
Padilla Speer Beardsley, Minneapolis

Trish Mielke
KMSP/WFTC, Eden Prairie

JJ Murray
Eden Prairie

Justin Piehowski
IB Systems, St. Paul

Barbara Reyelts
KBJR, Duluth

Kiki Rosatti
WCCO, Minneapolis

Jim Schiffman
Lakeville Government Television, Lakeville Government-access television (GATV)

Tim Scully
University of St. Thomas, St. Paul

Jean Zimmerman
Wayzata High School, Plymouth

Emmy award winners

Emmy award winners are individuals who show excellence in the field of television. The Emmys are held to the same esteem as the Oscar Awards are to motion pictures or the Grammy Awards are to the music industry.

External links
Upper Midwest Regional Emmy Awards Archives — list of award nominees and recipients since 2000
National Academy of Television Arts and Sciences Upper Midwest Chapter: An Inventory of Its Regional Emmy Award Winners at the Minnesota Historical Society — archives of award nominees and recipients since 2000, when the chapter started to present awards

References

Regional Emmy Awards
Awards established in 1973
1973 establishments in Minnesota
Television in Minnesota